Rodrigues (Portuguese: /ʁu.ˈdɾi.ɡɨʃ/) is a common surname in the Portuguese language. Its Spanish equivalent is Rodríguez. 

Rodrigues was originally a Patronymic, meaning Son of Rodrigo or Son of Rui. The "es" signifies "son of". The name Rodrigo (or the short form Rui) is the Portuguese form of Roderick, meaning "famous power" or "famous ruler", from the Germanic elements "hrod" (fame) and "ric" (power), from the Proto-Germanic *Hrōþirīk(i)az. It was the name of Roderic, the last Visigothic King before the Moorish Islamic conquest, and the subject of many legends. The surname Rodrigues could have originated in the 9th century when patronymic names originated. Its Spanish equivalent is Rodríguez.

It may refer to:

General
Diogo Rodrigues, Portuguese explorer
Eliane R. Rodrigues, Brazilian-Mexican applied mathematician and statistician
Jan Rodrigues, the first free black man to live in New York City
João Rodrigues Cabrilho, Portuguese explorer
João Rodrigues de Castelo Branco, known as Amato Lusitano, Portuguese physician
Olinde Rodrigues, French banker and mathematician
Sarmento Rodrigues, Portuguese marine official, colonist and professor
Valerian Rodrigues, Indian political scientist

Arts
Amália Rodrigues, Portuguese Fado singer
Francisco Rodrigues Lobo, Portuguese poet
Jose Maria Rodrigues Jr., known as Joe Junior, Hong Kong actor and former singer
Nelson Rodrigues, Brazilian writer
Rodrigues Ottolengui, American writer and dentist
Urbano Tavares Rodrigues, Portuguese writer
Vasco Rodrigues Santana, Portuguese actor
Victor Rodrigues, Indian novelist and short story writer

Politics
Américo de Deus Rodrigues Thomaz, Portuguese admiral and politician
Carmona Rodrigues, Portuguese politician
Ferro Rodrigues, Portuguese politician
Francisco de Paula Rodrigues Alves, Brazilian politician
Hermes Rodrigues da Fonseca, Brazilian politician
Pedro Verona Rodrigues Pires, Cape Verdean politician
Rudolph Rodrigues, Indian MP for Anglo Indian from Calcutta, West Bengal
Stephen Rodrigues, Ex-Policemen and politician, father of Dominic Rodrigues  and Bryan Rodrigues from Hyderabad, Telangana
Sunith Francis Rodrigues, Indian military and politician

Religion
Max Rodrigues, Pakistani Catholic priest, 4th Bishop of Hyderabad, Pakistan
Simão Rodrigues, Portuguese Jesuit

Sports
Adri Rodrígues (born 1988), Andorran international footballer
Christine Bannon-Rodrigues (born 1966), American martial artist and actress
Evan Rodrigues (born 1993), Canadian ice hockey player
Ivo Rodrigues (runner) (born 1960), Brazilian long-distance runner
Ivo Rodrigues (footballer) (born 1995), Portuguese footballer
Karin Rodrigues, Brazilian volleyball player
Kosta Rodrigues, German football player
Michael Rodrigues, Pakistani Catholic tennis player
Mônica Rodrigues, Brazilian volleyball player
Jemimah Rodrigues, Indian cricketer
Rodrigues (footballer) (born 1997), Brazilian footballer

See also
Portuguese name
Rodríguez (surname)

Portuguese-language surnames
Patronymic surnames
Surnames from given names